HD 154556, also known as HR 6357, is a solitary orange-hued star located in the southern circumpolar constellation Apus. It has an apparent magnitude of 6.21, placing it near the limit for naked eye visibility. At its current distance, HD 154556's brightness is diminished by 0.26 magnitudes due to interstellar dust. It has an absolute magnitude of +2.10.

HD 154556 has a stellar classification of K1 IV CN3, indicating that it is an evolved K-type subgiant with a moderate abundance of cyano radicals in its spectrum, making it a CN star. It has 1.25 times the mass of the Sun and is calculated to be 3.52 billion years old, having expanded to 6.35 times the radius of the Sun.

References

Apus (constellation)
K-type subgiants
CD-70 01498
154556
084158
6357
Apodis, 55
CN stars
High-proper-motion stars